Tol or TOL may refer to:

General
 Aryl, the toluyl functional group
 Tol language, an indigenous and near-extinct language of Honduras, also known as Jicaque

 Toluene, a clear, water-insoluble aromatic hydrocarbon

Places
 Tol (Castropol), Asturias, Spain
 An island in Quenya
 Tol, Federated States of Micronesia, a village
 Tol (island) in Chuuk State in the Federated States of Micronesia
 Tol, Iran, a village in Hormozgan Province, Iran

People
 Tol (surname), a Dutch surname
 Tol Avery (1915–1973), American film and television character actor
 Tol Hansse (1940–2002), stage name of Hans van Tol, Dutch singer and musician
 Vontongchai Intarawat (born 1987), Thai singer also known as Tol

Sports
 a team code for the Toledo Mud Hens

Transport
 Toledo Express Airport, Toledo, Ohio, United States
 Tolworth railway station, London, National Rail station code

Acronyms
 Treaty of Lisbon, a treaty amending the Treaties of the European Union
 Tales of Legendia, a 2005 PlayStation 2 role-playing game
 Tower of London
 Township of Langley, British Columbia, Canada
 Transitions Online, an online journal 
 Tree of life
 Tricare Online
 Throne of Lies, the online game of lies and deceit
 Tournament of Losers. See Greed

See also

Tola (disambiguation)
Toll (disambiguation)